North Clearwater is an unorganized territory in Clearwater County, Minnesota, United States. The population was 85 at the 2000 census.

Geography
According to the United States Census Bureau, the unorganized territory has a total area of 191.9 square miles (497.1 km2), of which 187.1 square miles (484.7 km2) is land and 4.8 square miles (12.4 km2) (2.50%) is water.

This unorganized territory falls completely within the boundaries of the Red Lake Indian Reservation.

Demographics
As of the census of 2000, there were 85 people, 27 households, and 21 families residing in the unorganized territory. The population density was 0.5 people per square mile (0.2/km2). There were 28 housing units at an average density of 0.1/sq mi (0.1/km2). The racial makeup of the unorganized territory was 2.35% White and 97.65% Native American. Hispanic or Latino of any race were 5.88% of the population.

There were 27 households, out of which 29.6% had children under the age of 18 living with them, 37.0% were married couples living together, 18.5% had a female householder with no husband present, and 22.2% were non-families. 22.2% of all households were made up of individuals, and 11.1% had someone living alone who was 65 years of age or older. The average household size was 3.15 and the average family size was 3.57.

In the unorganized territory the population was spread out, with 29.4% under the age of 18, 5.9% from 18 to 24, 41.2% from 25 to 44, 18.8% from 45 to 64, and 4.7% who were 65 years of age or older. The median age was 37 years. For every 100 females, there were 157.6 males. For every 100 females age 18 and over, there were 160.9 males.

The median income for a household in the unorganized territory was $23,875, and the median income for a family was $23,958. Males had a median income of $19,583 versus $21,786 for females. The per capita income for the unorganized territory was $9,389. There were 21.7% of families and 11.9% of the population living below the poverty line, including no under eighteens and none of those over 64.

References

Populated places in Clearwater County, Minnesota
Unorganized territories in Minnesota